József von Platthy (17 December 1900 – 21 December 1990) was a Hungarian military officier and horse rider who competed in the 1936 Summer Olympics.

In 1936 he and his horse Sellő won the bronze medal in the individual jumping competition.

External links
Profile 
Sports-Reference

1900 births
1990 deaths
Equestrians at the 1936 Summer Olympics
Hungarian male equestrians
Olympic bronze medalists for Hungary
Olympic equestrians of Hungary
Show jumping riders
Olympic medalists in equestrian
Medalists at the 1936 Summer Olympics
Sportspeople from Nógrád County